Twilight Zone: The Movie is a 1983 American science fiction anthology film produced by Steven Spielberg and John Landis. Based on Rod Serling's 1959–1964 television series of the same name, the film features four stories directed by Landis, Spielberg, Joe Dante, and George Miller. Landis' segment is an original story created for the film, while the segments by Spielberg, Dante, and Miller are remakes of episodes from the original series. The film's cast includes Dan Aykroyd, Albert Brooks, Scatman Crothers, John Lithgow, Vic Morrow, and Kathleen Quinlan. Original series cast members Burgess Meredith, Patricia Barry, Peter Brocco, Murray Matheson, Kevin McCarthy, Bill Mumy, and William Schallert also appear in the film, with Meredith assuming Serling's role as narrator.

The film's production achieved notoriety when Morrow and two illegally-hired child actors were killed in a  helicopter crash during filming of a stunt for Landis's segment. The deaths led to several years of legal action; although no individuals were found to be criminally liable, new procedures and safety standards were imposed in the filmmaking industry. Upon release, the film received mixed reviews, with praise directed at Dante and Miller's segments, but criticism towards the segments by Landis and Spielberg. Despite the controversy and mixed reception, it was a commercial success, grossing $42 million on a $10 million budget.

Plot

Prologue 
This segment was written and directed by John Landis. Two men are in a car driving along a country road late at night. The conversation turns to what episodes of The Twilight Zone they found most scary. The passenger then asks, "Do you want to see something really scary?" and says to pull over. He transforms into a monster and devours the driver.

Cast
 Albert Brooks as the Driver
 Dan Aykroyd as the Passenger

Segment one 

The first segment, "Time Out", is a partial reworking, but not a full remake, of the episode "Back There", involving a man who exits a club after a conversation about the feasibility of time travel to change the past, only to find that he has been transported to the past. The premise of that story from there, however, is mashed up with the morality tale of another classic episode "A Quality of Mercy", in which an overly impetuous lieutenant finds himself suddenly having swapped places with the enemy for a lesson on empathy. This segment was also written and directed by John Landis.

Bill Connor is bitter after being passed over for a promotion in favor of his Jewish co-worker, Goldman. Drinking in a bar after work with his friends Larry and Ray, Bill utters slurs towards Jews, blacks and East Asians, blaming them for America's problems. A black man sitting nearby asks him to stop. After ranting some more, Bill leaves the bar angrily and finds himself in Nazi-occupied France during World War II. A pair of S.S. officers patrolling the streets interrogate him, believing him to be Jewish. Bill can't answer satisfactorily since he doesn't speak German. A chase ensues, and Bill ends up on the ledge of a building, where he is shot at by the officers.

He falls from the ledge and lands in rural Alabama during the 1950s, where a group of Ku Klux Klansmen see him as a black man whom they are about to lynch. Bill tells them he is white, to no avail. While trying to escape, he jumps into a lake and surfaces in a jungle during the Vietnam War, being fired at by American soldiers, one of whom throws a grenade. Instead of killing him, the grenade launches him into occupied France again. There he is captured by the S.S. officers and put into an enclosed railroad freight car, along with Jewish prisoners bound for a concentration camp. Bill sees the bar with his friends standing outside, looking for him. He screams for help, but they can't see or hear him or the train as it pulls away.

Cast

 Vic Morrow – Bill Connor
 Doug McGrath – Larry
 Charles Hallahan – Ray
 Rainer Peets and Kai Wulff – German officers
 Steven Williams – Bar Patron
 Joseph Hieu and Al Leong – Vietnamese men
 Myca Dinh Le and Renee Shin-Yi Chen – Vietnamese children (scene deleted due to the death of both actors and Morrow during filming)
 Stephen Bishop – Charming G.I.
 Thomas Byrd, Vincent J. Isaac, Bill Taylor, and William S. Taylor – G.I.s
 Eddy Donno, Michael Milgron, Tom Willett, and John Larroquette – Ku Klux Klan members

Segment two 
The second segment is a remake of the episode "Kick the Can". This segment was directed by Steven Spielberg, from a screenplay by George Clayton Johnson, Richard Matheson, and Melissa Mathison (credited as Josh Rogan), and a story by Johnson.

An old man named Mr. Bloom has just moved into Sunnyvale Retirement Home. He listens to the other elders reminisce about the joys they experienced in their youth. Bloom insists that being elderly should not, and need not, prevent them from enjoying life. He invites them to join him, later that night, for a game of kick the can. Leo Conroy objects, saying that they cannot engage in physical activity because they are all elderly.

While Mr. Conroy sleeps, Mr. Bloom gathers the rest of the residents outside and plays the game, during which they are transformed into childhood versions of themselves. They are ecstatic to be young again, engaging in activities they enjoyed long ago, but their thoughts soon turn to practical matters such as where they will spend the night, since they will no longer be welcomed in the retirement home, and their families will not recognize them. They ask to be their true age again, and Mr. Bloom grants their wish, satisfied that, as with himself, their minds will remain young. Leo Conroy wakes up and notices that one resident, Mr. Agee, has opted to remain young. Conroy asks for Agee to take him along, but Agee tells him that such is impossible.

The next morning, Mr. Bloom finds Conroy kicking a can around the yard – having changed his outlook on life; Bloom breaks the fourth wall to assure the audience that "He'll get it." Bloom then departs from Sunnyvale for another retirement home, in order to spread his good-natured magic among other senior citizens.

Cast

 Scatman Crothers – Mr. Bloom
 Bill Quinn – Leo Conroy
 Martin Garner – Mr. Weinstein
 Selma Diamond – Mrs. Weinstein
 Helen Shaw – Mrs. Dempsey
 Murray Matheson – Mr. Agee
 Peter Brocco – Mr. Mute
 Priscilla Pointer – Miss Cox
 Scott Nemes – Young Mr. Weinstein
 Tanya Fenmore – Young Mrs. Weinstein
 Evan Richards – Young Mr. Agee
 Laura Mooney – Young Mrs. Dempsey
 Christopher Eisenmann – Young Mr. Mute
 Richard Swingler – Mr. Gray Panther
 Alan Haufrect – Mr. Conroy's Son
 Cheryl Socher – Mr. Conroy's Daughter-in-Law
 Elsa Raven – Nurse No. 2

Segment three 
The third segment is a remake of the episode "It's a Good Life". This segment was directed by Joe Dante, from a screenplay by Richard Matheson, based on the short story by Jerome Bixby.

Helen Foley, traveling to a new job, visits a rural bar for directions. While talking to the owner, she witnesses a young boy, Anthony, being harassed by a local trying to watch a boxing match. Helen comes to the boy's defense. As Helen leaves the bar, she backs into Anthony with her car in the parking lot, damaging his bicycle. Helen offers Anthony a ride home.

When Helen arrives with Anthony at home, she meets his family: Uncle Walt, sister Ethel, and mother and father. Anthony's family are excessively welcoming. Anthony starts to show Helen around the house, while the family rifles through Helen's purse and coat. There is a television set in every room showing cartoons. She comes to the room of another sister, Sara. Helen calls out to the girl, who is in a wheelchair and watching television, and gets no response. Anthony explains that Sara had been in an accident. Helen is not able to see that the girl has no mouth.

Anthony announces that it is time for dinner, which consists of ice cream, candy apples, potato chips, and hamburgers topped with peanut butter. Confused at first at the family's unconventional diet, Helen thinks that this is a birthday dinner for Anthony. Ethel complains at the prospect of another birthday; Anthony glares at her, and her plate flies out of her hands. Helen attempts to leave, but Anthony urges Helen to stay and see Uncle Walt's "hat trick". A top hat appears on top of the television set. Uncle Walt is very nervous about what could be in the hat, but he pulls out an ordinary rabbit. Anthony insists on an encore, and a large, mutant rabbit springs from the hat. As Helen attempts to flee, she spills the contents of her purse, and Anthony finds a note inside stating "Help us! Anthony is a monster!" When the family points the finger at Ethel, she reveals to Helen that they are not Anthony's real relatives. Anthony brought them to his house to be his surrogate family after he killed his parents, and presumably he is doing the same with Helen. In punishment for writing the note, Anthony sends Ethel into the television set where she is pursued and eaten by a cartoon dragon.

Helen attempts to escape, only to have the door blocked by a giant eye. Anthony vents his frustration at everyone being afraid of him, summoning another cartoonish monster out of the television. When Helen tells him to "wish it away", he makes the entire house disappear, taking himself and Helen outside the physical plane of existence. Anthony says that he sent his "family" back where they came from, since they did not want to be with him. He cannot understand why everyone is unhappy with him, since he believes he provided for their every possible desire.

Helen offers to be Anthony's teacher and student, and to help him find new, even greater uses for his power. Satisfied that she'll never "abandon" him, and having at last foreseen the true end results of his reign of terror, Anthony welcomes Helen's offer and magically brings back her car. As they drive through a barren landscape, meadows filled with bright flowers spring up alongside the road in the pair's wake.

Cast

 Kathleen Quinlan – Helen Foley
 Jeremy Licht – Anthony
 Kevin McCarthy – Uncle Walt
 Patricia Barry – Mother
 William Schallert – Father
 Nancy Cartwright – Ethel
 Dick Miller – Walter Paisley
 Cherie Currie – Sara
 Bill Mumy – Tim
 Jeffrey Bannister – Charlie

Segment four 
The fourth segment is a remake of the episode "Nightmare at 20,000 Feet". This segment was directed by George Miller, and written by Richard Matheson.

While flying through a violent thunderstorm, airline passenger John Valentine is in a lavatory trying to recover from a panic attack due to a fear of flying. The flight attendants coax Valentine from the lavatory and back to his seat.

Valentine notices a hideous gremlin on the wing of the plane and spirals into another severe panic. He watches as the creature wreaks havoc on the wing, throwing debris into one of the plane's turbofan engines and causing a flameout. Valentine finally snaps and attempts to break the window with an oxygen canister, but is wrestled to the ground by another passenger, a sky marshal. Valentine takes the marshal's revolver, shoots out the window (causing a breach in the pressurized cabin), and begins firing at the gremlin. This catches the attention of the gremlin, who rushes up to Valentine and bites the gun in half. After they notice that the plane is landing, the gremlin grabs Valentine's face, then simply scolds him for spoiling its fun by wagging its finger in his face. The creature leaps into the sky and flies away as the airplane begins its emergency landing.

The police, crew, and passengers write off Valentine as insane. However, the aircraft maintenance crew arrives and finds the damage to the plane's engines complete with claw marks, while a straitjacketed Valentine is carried off in an ambulance. The ambulance driver is the car passenger from the prologue. The driver turns to Valentine and says "Heard you had a big scare up there, huh? Wanna see something really scary?"

Cast

 John Lithgow – John Valentine
 Abbe Lane – Sr. Flight attendant
 Donna Dixon – Jr. Flight attendant
 John Dennis Johnston – Co-Pilot
 Larry Cedar – Gremlin
 Charles Knapp – Sky marshal
 Christina Nigra – Little girl
 Eduard Franz – Old man
 Jeffrey Weissman – Young man

Production 
The cartoon dragon in segment three was animated by Sally Cruikshank of Quasi at the Quackadero fame.

The prologue scene with Aykroyd and Brooks was shot before the Vic Morrow helicopter accident. All the other segments were shot after it occurred, and some have claimed that Spielberg's heart wasn't in the project anymore by the time he had begun to film his segment.

Helicopter accident 

During the filming of the "Time Out” segment, directed by Landis on July 23, 1982, at around 2:30 a.m., actor Vic Morrow and child actors Myca Dinh Le (age 7) and Renee Shin-Yi Chen (age 6) died in an accident involving a helicopter being used on the set. The two child actors were hired in violation of California law, which prohibits child actors from working at night or in proximity to explosions, and requires the presence of a teacher or social worker. During the subsequent trial, Landis denied culpability for the accident, but admitted that their hiring was "wrong".

Producer and co-director Steven Spielberg was so disgusted by Landis's handling of the situation, he ended their friendship and publicly called for the end of the New Hollywood Era, where directors had almost complete control over film. When approached by the press about the accident, he stated, "No movie is worth dying for. I think people are standing up much more now, than ever before, to producers and directors who ask too much. If something isn't safe, it's the right and responsibility of every actor or crew member to yell, 'Cut!'" Co-director George Miller was so repulsed by the entire scenario, he abandoned post-production of his segment, leaving Joe Dante to supervise editing.

The scenes involving the child actors were not in Landis's original draft for the segment. After Warner Brothers executives Lucy Fisher and Terry Semel objected that the central character of the segment was too unsympathetic, Landis came up with the idea of Morrow's character, Bill Connor, redeeming himself by rescuing two Vietnamese orphans. In the scene that served as the revised ending, Bill was to have traveled back through time again and stumbled into a deserted Vietnamese village where he finds two young Vietnamese children left behind when a U.S. Army helicopter appears and begins shooting at them. Morrow was to take both children under his arms and escape out of the village as the hovering helicopter destroyed the village with multiple explosions. The helicopter pilot had trouble navigating through the fireballs created by pyrotechnic effects for the sequence. A technician on the ground did not know this and detonated two of the pyrotechnic charges close together. The flash-force of the two explosions caused the low-flying helicopter to spin out of control and crash land on top of Morrow and the two children as they were crossing a small pond away from the village mock-up. All three were killed instantly; Morrow and Le were decapitated by the helicopter's top rotor blades while Chen was crushed to death by one of the struts. A report released in May 1984 by the National Transportation Safety Board stated: 

Landis has said that the actual ending of the segment was unaffected by the accident. When asked how the film changed from its initial conception after the accident, Landis replied, "The intercutting between the actions of the KKK and American GIs and the Vietcong and the Nazis became more and more frenetic as [Bill] tried to protect the children. Finally, the Nazis take the children away and shoot them and load him up on the train. We decided not to use any footage of the children. It was a very difficult situation. Do we keep it in the movie? ...And, ultimately, we decided it would be really outrageous to Vic Morrow if we just cut it out of the movie completely. Landis has also said, "There are moments [in the segment] I think work well. When [Bill] is in the cattle car, and he looks back and you see his POV of the bar going by. I think that's an unsettling image."

Myca and Renee were being paid under the table to circumvent California's child labor laws. California did not allow children to work at night. Landis opted not to seek a waiver. The casting agents were unaware that the children would be involved in the scene. Associate producer George Folsey, Jr. told the children's parents not to tell any firefighters on set that the children were part of the scene, and also hid them from a fire safety officer who also worked as a welfare worker. A fire safety officer was concerned the blasts would cause a crash, but did not tell Landis of his concerns.

The accident led to civil and criminal action against the filmmakers which lasted nearly a decade. Landis, Folsey, production manager Dan Allingham, pilot Dorcey Wingo and explosives specialist Paul Stewart were tried and acquitted on charges of manslaughter in a nine-month trial in 1986 and 1987. As a result of the accident, second assistant director Andy House had his name removed from the credits and replaced with the pseudonym Alan Smithee. The incident also resulted in the establishment of the Motion Picture & Entertainment Unit within the CAL FIRE Office of the State Fire Marshal to enforce fire safety regulations and requirements in the entertainment industry.

The accident became the subject of an episode of the 2020 docuseries Cursed Films.

Release and reception 
Twilight Zone: The Movie opened on June 24, 1983, and received mixed reviews. Roger Ebert of the Chicago Sun-Times rated each segment individually, awarding them (on a scale of four stars): two for the prologue and first segment, one-and-a-half for the second, three-and-a-half stars for the third, and three-and-a-half for the final. Ebert noted that "the surprising thing is, the two superstar directors are thoroughly routed by two less-known directors whose previous credits have been horror and action pictures... Spielberg, who produced the whole project, perhaps sensed that he and Landis had the weakest results, since he assembles the stories in an ascending order of excitement. Twilight Zone starts slow, almost grinds to a halt, and then has a fast comeback." The New York Times film critic Vincent Canby called the movie a "flabby, mini-minded behemoth."

Colin Greenland reviewed Twilight Zone: The Movie for Imagine magazine, and stated that "Macabre stuff, but not really very impressive as modern fantastic cinema from four of its grand masters."

The critical consensus reads, "The Twilight Zone: The Movie suffers from the typical anthology-film highs and lows; thankfully, the former outnumber the latter." On Metacritic, the film has a score of 44 out of 100, based on eight reviews, indicating "mixed or average reviews". In 2015, ComingSoon.net ranked the prologue with Dan Aykroyd and Albert Brooks as the greatest opening scene in horror history, labelling it "brilliant, loose, funny and ultimately, disturbing." In 2020, Looper included it on their list of "The Most Terrifying Opening Scenes In Horror Films".

According to Box Office Mojo, it opened at number 4, grossing $6,614,366 in its opening weekend at 1,275 theaters, averaging $5,188 per theater (adjusting to $15,076,555 and a $11,825 average in 2009). It later expanded to 1,288 theaters and ended up grossing $29,450,919 in the United States and Canada. Internationally, it grossed $12.5 million for a worldwide gross of $42 million. Having cost $10 million to make, it was not the enormous hit which executives were looking for, but it was still a financial success and it helped stir enough interest for CBS to give the go-ahead to the 1980s TV version of The Twilight Zone.

Home media

The film was released to LaserDisc and VHS several times, most recently as part of WB's "Hits" line, and was released for DVD, HD DVD, and Blu-ray on October 9, 2007. Both the Blu-ray and DVD are out of print and are considered collector's items.

 Novelization 
Robert Bloch wrote the book adaptation of Twilight Zone: The Movie. Bloch's order of segments does not match the order in the film itself, as he was given the original screenplay to work with, in which "Nightmare at 20,000 Feet" was the second segment, and "Kick the Can" was the fourth. The movie's prologue is missing in the novelization. Bloch claimed that no one told him the anthology had a wraparound sequence. Bloch also said that in the six weeks he was given to write the book, he only saw a screening of two of the segments; he had to hurriedly change the ending of the first segment, after the helicopter accident that occurred during filming. As originally written, the first segment would have ended as it did in the original screenplay (Connor finds redemption by saving two Vietnamese children whose village is being destroyed by the Air Cavalry). The finished book reflects how the first segment ends in the final cut of the film.

 Soundtrack 
Jerry Goldsmith, who scored several episodes of the original series, composed the music for the movie and re-recorded Marius Constant's series theme. The original soundtrack album was released by Warner Bros. Records.

Segment 1 is the only segment whose music is not included in the overture (actually the film's end title music).

A complete recording of the dramatic score, including a previously-unreleased song by Joseph Williams, was released in April 2009 by Film Score Monthly, representing the soundtrack's first US release on Compact Disc. Both songs were used in Segment 1 and were produced by Bruce Botnick with James Newton Howard (Howard also arranged "Nights Are Forever"). The promotional song from this movie, "Nights Are Forever", written by Jerry Goldsmith with lyricist John Bettis, and sung by Jennifer Warnes, is heard briefly during the jukebox scene in the opening segment with Vic Morrow.

The full orchestra score of the film was released by Neumation Music' in 2022.

References

Sources

External links 

 
 
 
 
 
 
 

The Twilight Zone
1983 fantasy films
1980s science fiction horror films
1983 films
1983 horror films
American aviation films
American dark fantasy films
American horror anthology films
American science fiction horror films
American supernatural horror films
American World War II films
Films about gremlins
Films about Nazis
Films about racism
Films about television
Films about the Ku Klux Klan
Films about time travel
Films based on multiple works
Films based on short fiction
Films based on television series
Films based on works by Richard Matheson
Films directed by George Miller
Films directed by Joe Dante
Films directed by John Landis
Films directed by Steven Spielberg
Films produced by George Folsey Jr.
Films produced by John Landis
Films produced by Steven Spielberg
Films scored by Jerry Goldsmith
Films set in France
Films set in the 1940s
Films set in the 1950s
Films set in the 1960s
Films set on airplanes
Films shot in California
Films shot in Los Angeles
Films using stop-motion animation
Films with screenplays by George Clayton Johnson
Films with screenplays by John Landis
Films with screenplays by Melissa Mathison
Films with screenplays by Richard Matheson
1980s French-language films
1980s German-language films
Vietnamese-language films
Vietnam War films
Warner Bros. films
1980s English-language films
1980s American films